is a railway station in Tagawa, Fukuoka Prefecture, Japan. It is on the Tagawa Line, operated by the Heisei Chikuhō Railway. Trains arrive roughly every 30 minutes. East of the station, the JR Kyushu-operated Hitahikosan Line branches off to the north. However, JR Kyushu does not serve this station.

On 1 April 2009, a local recycling plant, Kanda Shōten, acquired naming rights to the station.

External links
Kamiita Station (Heisei Chikuhō Railway website)

References

Railway stations in Fukuoka Prefecture
Railway stations in Japan opened in 2001
Heisei Chikuhō Railway Tagawa Line